The 1904 Spring Hill Badgers football team represented Spring Hill College as an independent during the 1904 college football season. The Fort Morgan soldier outweighed the team by twenty pounds.

Schedule

References

Spring Hill
Spring Hill Badgers football seasons
College football undefeated seasons
Spring Hill Badgers football